In tennis, a golden set is a set which is won without losing a single point. This means scoring the 24 minimum points required to win the set 6–0, without conceding any points.

In professional tennis, this has occurred twice in the main draw of top-level events. It has also happened a number of times in the pre-tournament qualifier of the lowest-level events. Bill Scanlon had a golden second set in his win over Marcos Hocevar at the 1983 Delray Beach WCT event. Yaroslava Shvedova had a golden first set in her win over Sara Errani at the 2012 Wimbledon Championships. Tennis legend Steffi Graf came close to achieving the feat in the finals of the 1989 Virginia Slims of Washington tournament, winning the first five games to love against Zina Garrison, before winning the match 6-1, 7-5. 

A golden match is when a player does not lose a single point in the entire match. There are five documented cases of this at low-level events. Hazel Wightman first did so in a 1910 amateur match in the state of Washington. Then it happened twice in France in the qualifiers of lowest-level professional events, two of them in the span of two months, both against the same 55-year-old man, Tomas Fabian. A more recent televised Golden Match, involved Krittin Koaykul beating Artem Bahmet during a qualifying match at ITF World Tennis Tour event in Doha, and scoring the minimum 48 points to win.

List of occurrences

Main draws of top-level professional events are in boldface.

References

Tennis terminology
Tennis records and statistics
Perfect scores in sports